This article represents all appearances that Emmylou Harris has contributed to, in collaboration with artists from L to Q.

Other sections 
Solo contributions
Collaborations A–F
Collaborations G–K
Collaborations R–Z

Collaborations L–Q

 No detailed track information is available for this album.

References

Country music discographies
Lists of songs
 Emmylou Harris appearances
 Emmylou Harris appearances
Folk music discographies
Musical collaborations